Mehdi Bardhi (14 September 1927 - 3 April 1994) was a Kosovar linguist, author, and teacher.

Life

Bardhi was born in Prizren, Kingdom of Serbs, Croats and Slovenes. He completed his primary and secondary education in Prizren and Pristina. After working as a teacher during the immediate post-war period, he continued his studies within the  University of Belgrade Faculty of Philosophy.  His post-graduate studies were completed in the 50s in the same university in Belgrade, where he presented his degree on the subject of the specifics of the spoken language of Has region.

After completing his post-graduate studies in Belgrade, Prof. Mehdi Bardhi returns to work in Pristina, first at the Superior Pedagogical School and then at the Institute of Albanology in Pristina.  He also worked as an Educational Counselor of the Institute of Education Advancement, Associate Professor of the Faculty of Philosophy in Pristina, Vice-President of the Pedagogical School in Prizren, Chief of Department of the Albanian language and literature of the Superior Pedagogical School of Pristina and the Faculty of Philosophy, and Dean of the Faculty of Philosophy, University of Pristina.

At the University of Pristina, he has lectured on Albanian language subjects such as: Phonetics, Morphology, Syntax, Introduction to the Linguistics, History of the language, Lexicology and Old Textbooks.

During the academic year 1989/90, he was a visiting professor of the Albanian language in the Foreign Languages University in Beijing, China, where he published the book of Albanian grammar for Chinese students.

He was one of the original three founders of the Institute of Albanology in Pristina, and the forceful closure of the Institute by the Yugoslavian authorities during the Slobodan Milosević era was particularly devastating to him.

He was a board member of several magazines, such as: Advancement, Bulletin of Superior Pedagogical School of Pristina, Bulletin of Faculty of Philosophy, Gjurmime Albanologjike, Language Studies I – Dialectology, Studia Humanistica, International Seminar of the Albanian language, literature and culture.  He was honored with the State Golden Medal for his lifetime work efforts.

Professor Bardhi authored and co-authored seventeen books and dictionaries, six academic brochures, over thirty published articles in scientific journals, seventeen translated books, collector of folkloric songs which were published by the Institute of Albanology, among others.

He died on 3 April 1994 in Pristina, FR Yugoslavia.

Works 
Serbocroatian-Albanian Dictionary, Institute of Albanology, Pristina, 1974
Albanian-Serbocroatian Dictionary, Institute of Albanology, Pristina, 1981
 Learn Albanian, Enti i Teksteve dhe i Mjeteve Mësimore i Krahinës Socialiste Autonome të Kosovës, 1986
Foreign Words Dictionary
Modernes albanisch im Selbststudium, Univ. Bibl., Auswertungsstelle für Ostsprachen, 1977, 366 pages
Mësojmë shqip: për klasën VI të shkollës fillore, Enti i Teksteve dhe i Mjeteve Mësimore i Krahinës Socialiste Autonome të Kosovës, 1977
Fjalor serbokroatisht shqip: Srpskohrvatsko albanski rečnik, Rilindja, 1989
Ditët gazmore: libër leximi : për klasën V të shkollës fillore, Enti i Teksteve dhe i Mjeteve Mësimore i Krahinës Socialiste Autonome të Kosovës, 1985
Zgjimi i jetës: libër leximi për klasen V të shkollës fillore, Enti i teksteve dhe i mjetevë mësimore i krakinës socialiste autonome të Kosovës, 1976, 165 pages
Erë të mbarë "Shpend i kaltër", Rilindja, 1985
Teksti i gjuhes shqipe per te huaj, 1974, 164 pages
Učimo šiptarski: priručnik za učenike V i VI razreda osnovne škole sa srpskohrvatskim nastavnim jezikom, Zavod za izdavanje udžbenika Socijalističke Republike Srbije, 1963, 144 pages
Teksti i gjuhës shqipe për të huaj, Univ. Bibliothek, 1977, 366 pages

References

External links
Serbocroatian-Albanian Dictionary
Google Books
Intervistë me Albanologun Istvan Schutz Albanian

1927 births
1994 deaths
People from Prizren
Academic staff of the University of Pristina
University of Belgrade Faculty of Philosophy alumni
Albanologists
Yugoslav schoolteachers
Linguists from Kosovo
Yugoslav folklorists
Yugoslav translators
Linguists from Yugoslavia
Albanian–Serbian translators
Serbian–Albanian translators
Yugoslav Albanians
20th-century translators
20th-century linguists
Kosovan translators